Nadir Shah (born 2 October 2000) is a Pakistani cricketer. He made his Twenty20 debut for Karachi Whites in the 2018–19 National T20 Cup on 11 December 2018.

References

External links
 

2000 births
Living people
Pakistani cricketers
Karachi Whites cricketers
Place of birth missing (living people)